On 22 August 2020, a South West Aviation An-26 turboprop aircraft crashed upon taking off from Juba Airport in Juba, South Sudan, for a domestic cargo charter flight to Aweil and to Wau, South Sudan.

Background 
South West Aviation Co. Ltd. founded in 2017, is a passenger and cargo airline based in Juba, South Sudan. The airline was responsible for the fatal crash of an L-410 Turbolet in Juba in 2018. In the aftermath of that accident, President Salva Kiir banned aircraft greater than 20 years of age from operating passenger flights.

Accident 
Eyewitnesses report that the aircraft suddenly lost power and crashed in the Hai Referendum residential area. Weather is not believed to be a factor. 8 people in the aircraft (3 South Sudanese, and 5 Russians) were killed. There was one reported survivor who was taken to a hospital in critical condition. According to South Sudanese Transport Minister Madut Biar Yol there were five crew members, all Russian nationals.

According to early reports, the plane crashed into a residential area. It burned as residents approached it.

Some reports indicated the aircraft was on a charter flight for the World Food Programme (WFP) when it crashed, and was carrying spare parts, motorbikes, food, as well as NGO staff salaries, though the WFP subsequently clarified that the aircraft had in fact been chartered by Galaxy Star International, a local company that provides services to the WFP and other UN agencies.

Reactions 
South Sudanese president Salva Kiir called upon the Ministry of Transportation to "adhere to international standards" when assessing the airworthiness of aircraft adding "I know that it is hard to cope with the tragedy of this nature, but let us work hard to find the cause of this accident and use the lessons learned from it to prevent the occurrence of similar tragedies in the future".

See also
2015 Juba An-12 crash
2019 Busy Bee Congo crash
2020 Chuhuiv An-26 crash

Other crashes in residential areas
El Al Flight 1862
Pakistan International Airlines Flight 8303

External links

2020 in South Sudan
August 2020 events in South Sudan
Aviation accidents and incidents in 2020
Aviation accidents and incidents in South Sudan
History of South Sudan
Transport in South Sudan
Accidents and incidents involving the Antonov An-26